Note: vowels in this article are reconstructed via comparative Semitics.

Ugaritic is an extinct Northwest Semitic language. This article describes the grammar of the Ugaritic language. For more information regarding the Ugaritic language in general, see Ugaritic language.

Overview
Ugaritic is an inflected language, and as a Semitic language its grammatical features are highly similar to those found in Classical Arabic and Akkadian. It possesses two genders (masculine and feminine), three cases for nouns and adjectives (nominative, accusative, and genitive [also, note the possibility of a locative case]) ; three numbers: (singular, dual, and plural); and verb aspects similar to those found in other Northwest Semitic languages. The word order for Ugaritic is verb–subject–object (VSO), possessed–possessor (NG), and noun–adjective (NA). Ugaritic is considered a conservative Semitic language, since it retains most of the Proto-Semitic phonemes, the basic qualities of the vowel, the case system, the word order of the Proto-Semitic ancestor, and the lack of the definite article.

Grammar

Word order
The word order for Ugaritic is Subject Verb Object (SVO), Verb Subject  Object (VSO), possessed–possessor (NG), and noun–adjective (NA).

Morphology
Ugaritic, like all Semitic languages, exhibits a unique pattern of stems consisting typically of "triliteral", or 3-consonant consonantal roots (2- and 4-consonant roots also exist), from which nouns, adjectives, and verbs are formed in various ways: e.g. by inserting vowels, doubling consonants, and/or adding prefixes, suffixes, or infixes.

Verbs

Aspects

Verbs in Ugaritic have 2 aspects: perfect for completed action (with pronominal suffixes) and imperfect for uncompleted action (with pronominal prefixes and suffixes). Verb formation in Ugaritic (like all Semitic languages) is based on triconsonantal roots. Affixes inserted into the root form different meanings. Taking the root RGM (which means "to say") for example:

Moods
Ugaritic verbs occur in 5 moods:

Patterns
Ugaritic verbs occur in 10 reconstructed patterns or binyanim:

Nouns
Nouns in Ugaritic can be categorized according to their inflection into: cases (nominative, genitive, and accusative), state (absolute and construct), gender (masculine and feminine), and number (singular, dual, and plural).

Case
Ugaritic has three grammatical cases corresponding to: nominative, genitive, and accusative. Normally, singular nouns take the ending -u in the nominative, -i in the genitive and -a in the accusative. Using the word malk- (king) and malkat- (queen) for example:

As in Arabic, some exceptional nouns (known as diptotes) have the suffix -a in the genitive. There is no Ugaritic equivalent for Classical Arabic nunation or Akkadian mimation.

State
Nouns in Ugaritic occur in two states: absolute and construct.
If a noun is followed by a genitival attribute (noun in the genitive or suffixed pronoun) it becomes a construct (denoting possession). Otherwise, it is in the absolute state. Ugaritic, unlike Arabic and Hebrew, has no definite article.

Gender
Nouns which have no gender marker are for the most part masculine, although some feminine nouns do not have a feminine marker. However, these denote feminine beings such as ʼumm- (mother).  /-t/ is the feminine marker which is directly attached to the base of the noun.

Number
Ugaritic distinguishes between nouns based on quantity. All nouns are either singular when there is one, dual when there are two, and plural if there are three or more.

Singular
The singular has no marker and is inflected according to its case.

Dual
The marker for the dual in the absolute state appears as /-m/. However, the vocalization may be reconstructed as /-āmi/ in the nominative (such as malkāmi "two kings") and /-ēmi/ for the genitive and accusative (e.g. malkēmi). For the construct state, it is /-ā/ and /-ē/ respectively.

Plural
Ugaritic has only regular plurals (i.e. no broken plurals). Masculine absolute state plurals take the forms /-ūma/ in the nominative and /-īma/ in the genitive and accusative. In the construct state they are /-ū/ and /-ī/ respectively.  The female afformative plural is /-āt/ with a case marker probably following the /-t/, giving /-ātu/ for the nominative and /-āti/ for the genitive and accusative in both absolute and construct state.

Adjectives
Adjectives follow the noun and are declined exactly like the preceding noun.

Personal pronouns

Independent personal pronouns

Independent personal pronouns in Ugaritic are as follows (some forms are lacking because they are not in the corpus of the language):

Suffixed (or enclitic) pronouns

Suffixed (or enclitic) pronouns (mainly denoting the genitive and accusative) are as follows:

Numerals

The following is a table of Ugaritic numerals:

Ordinals 
The following is a table of Ugaritic ordinals:

See also 

 Ugarit
 Ugaritic language
 Ugaritic alphabet
 Northwest Semitic languages
 Central Semitic languages
 Semitic Languages
 Proto-Semitic language

Notes

References

External links 
 Ugarit and the Bible (An excerpt from an online introductory course on Ugaritic grammar (the Quartz Hill School of Theology's course noted in the links below); includes a cursory discussion on the relationship between Ugaritic and Old Testament/Hebrew Bible literature.)
 Introduction to Ugaritic Grammar (Quartz Hill School of Theology)
 Introduction to Ugaritic Grammar (University of Chicago)
 Unicode Chart

Ugaritic language and literature
Semitic grammars